Felony petty theft is the colloquial term for a statute in the California Penal Code (Section 666) that makes it possible for a person who commits the crime of petty theft to be charged with a felony rather than a misdemeanor if the accused had previously been convicted of a theft-related crime at any time in the past.  The technical name for the charge is petty theft with a prior.

Interaction with "three strikes" law 

Though this law has been on the books in California since 1972, its existence took on new importance after the state's voters approved a three strikes law in a 1994 referendum, when it appeared on the ballot as Proposition 184.  In certain cases, a person with two prior felony convictions has been charged with a third felony for committing a minor shoplifting crime.  If one of the two previous felony charges had involved stealing in any manner then the shoplifting conviction, thus upgraded to a felony, would result in a mandatory sentence of 25 years to life in prison under the three-strikes law.

This scenario has aroused harsh criticism, not only throughout the United States, but also globally; several court challenges to its inclusion in the three-strikes law were pending as of 2004, but a ballot measure that would have eliminated it, known as Proposition 66, was rejected by California voters on November 2, 2004; the measure was opposed by most law-enforcement unions in the state, and also by Governor Arnold Schwarzenegger.  The main complaint with Proposition 66 was that it would retroactively resentence all offenders convicted of third strike offenses, allowing violent criminals (who had served sentences for their previous crimes) to be released.

In 2012, a revised measure aimed at moderating the effects of the three-strikes rule, known as Proposition 36, was passed by voters. This required that, except where the offender had previously been convicted of rape, murder or child molestation, the third strike must be a "serious or violent" felony.

Texas, Washington, Colorado, Connecticut, Indiana, Kansas, Nevada, North Dakota, Arkansas, Georgia, Maryland, Montana, New Jersey, New Mexico, North Carolina, Pennsylvania, South Carolina, Utah, Vermont, Wisconsin, Florida, Tennessee, Virginia, and Arizona have also enacted Three Strikes laws for habitual offenders, making petty larceny a felony if there have been prior convictions.

Theft
California law
U.S. state criminal law